Valazjerd (also Romanized as Valāzjerd, Velāzjerd, and Wālāzird) is a village in Ak Rural District, Esfarvarin District, Takestan County, Qazvin Province, Iran. At the 2006 census, its population was 1,272, in 333 families.

References 

Populated places in Takestan County